Almqvist is a surname of Swedish origin. Notable people with the surname include:

Anders Almqvist (1885–1915), Swedish rower who competed in the 1912 Summer Olympics
Bertil Almqvist (1902–1972),  Swedish author and illustrator 
Carl Jonas Love Almqvist (1793–1866), Swedish composers and romantic poet 
Erland Almqvist (1912–1999), Swedish sailor who competed in the 1952 Summer Olympics
Ester Almqvist (1869–1934), Swedish painter
Ingrid Almqvist (1927–2017), Swedish javelin thrower
Johan Magnus Almqvist  (1799–1873), Swedish theologian 
Kurt Almqvist  (1912–2001), Swedish poet, intellectual and spiritual figure 
Ludvig Almqvist  (1818–1884), Swedish politician
Niklas Almqvist (born 1977), Swedish guitarist and backup vocalist 
Pelle Almqvist (born 1978), Swedish lead singer of Swedish garage rock band The Hives
Pontus Almqvist (born 1999), Swedish footballer

Swedish-language surnames